Bordaia paradoxa is a species of moth of the family Hepialidae. It is endemic to Western Australia.

References

External links
Hepialidae genera

Moths described in 1932
Hepialidae